General elections were held in Guyana on 9 December 1985. The result was a victory for the People's National Congress, which won 42 of the 53 directly-elected seats. However, the elections were marred by fraud and the People's Progressive Party and Working People's Alliance withdrew on election day. Voter turnout was 73.8%.

Electoral system
The National Assembly had 65 members; 53 elected by proportional representation in a nationwide constituency, 10 appointed by the Regional Councils elected on the same date as the national members, and 2 appointed by the National Congress of Local Democratic Organs, an umbrella body representing the regional councils.

The President was elected by a first-past-the-post double simultaneous vote system, whereby each list nominated a presidential candidate and the candidate heading the list that received the most votes was elected president.

Results

References

Guyana
1985 in Guyana
Elections in Guyana
December 1985 events